Noleen Lennon (born 22 March 1984), also known as Noleen Armstrong, is a former Northern Ireland netball international. She represented Northern Ireland at the 2003, 2011 and 2019 Netball World Cups and at the 2014 and 2018 Commonwealth Games. She was also a member of the Northern Ireland teams that were silver medallists at the 2012 and 2017 European Netball Championships. She captained Northern Ireland when they won the 2009 Nations Cup and then again at the 2011 World Netball Championships.

Early life, family and education
Lennon is from Portaferry, County Down.
She is a relative of Ciara Mageean, a track and field athlete who also represented Northern Ireland at the 2018 Commonwealth Games.
While attending Ulster University, Lennon served as president of the university's sports union.

Playing career

Clubs

Belfast Ladies
Lennon plays for Belfast Ladies in the Northern Ireland Premier League.

Team Northumbria
Lennon has played for Team Northumbria in the Netball Superleague. She initially played for Team Northumbria during the 2005–06 season. As part of their preparations for the 2014 Commonwealth Games, the Northern Ireland national netball team formed a partnership with Team Northumbria. This saw Lennon and six other Northern Ireland internationals – Oonagh McCullough, Fionnuala Toner, Caroline O'Hanlon, Gemma Gibney, Michelle Drayne and Niamh Cooper – play for Team Northumbria during the 2014 season.

Northern Ireland
Lennon represented Northern Ireland at the 2003, 2011 and 2019 Netball World Cups and at the 2014 and 2018 Commonwealth Games. She was also a member of the Northern Ireland teams that were silver medallists at the 2012 and 2017 European Netball Championships. She captained Northern Ireland when they won the 2009 Nations Cup and then again at the 2011 World Netball Championships. Lennon initially retired after the 2018 Commonwealth Games but was recalled for the 2019 Netball World Cup as an injury replacement for Lisa Bowman who missed out due to serious ankle injury. In January 2018 she had helped Northern Ireland secure their place in the 2019 Netball World Cup with a player of the match performance against Wales during qualification tournament.

Other sports
Lennon has also played both basketball and ladies' Gaelic football at club level. Together with Fionnuala Toner, she was a member of the Ulster Rockets team that won  Basketball Ireland's Women's National Cup in January 2011. She also played gaelic football for the Antrim GAA club, Glenavy.

Honours
Northern Ireland
Nations Cup
Winners: 2009: 1 
European Netball Championship
Runner up: 2012, 2017: 2

References

1984 births
Living people
Northern Ireland netball internationals
Netball players at the 2014 Commonwealth Games
Netball players at the 2018 Commonwealth Games
Commonwealth Games competitors for Northern Ireland
2019 Netball World Cup players
Team Northumbria netball players
Netball Superleague players
Alumni of Ulster University
Irish women's basketball players
Sportspeople from County Down
People from Bangor, County Down
2011 World Netball Championships players